Ten Mile Creek State Fish and Wildlife Area is an Illinois state park on  in Hamilton and Jefferson Counties, Illinois, United States.

References
 

State parks of Illinois
Protected areas of Hamilton County, Illinois
Protected areas of Jefferson County, Illinois
Protected areas established in 1988
1988 establishments in Illinois